The Arado Ar 96 is a German single-engine, low-wing monoplane of all-metal construction, produced by Arado Flugzeugwerke. It was the Luftwaffes standard advanced trainer during World War II.

Design and development
Designed by Walter Blume as the result of a 1936 Reich Air Ministry tender, the prototype, powered by a 179 kW (240 hp) Argus As 10c engine, first flew in 1938. In 1939, an initial batch of Ar 96A aircraft was produced. This was followed by the major production series, the more powerful Ar 96B, fitted with the Argus As 410 engine.

In 1943, Arado started development of a new derivative of the Ar 96, using non-strategic metals and wood, to be powered by a  Argus As 411 MA engine. The French company SIPA was ordered to build three prototypes and 25 preseries aircraft, but the Allied invasion of France forced the Germans to shift production of the Ar 396 to Czechoslovakia. The first Czech-built example flew on 24 November 1944, with about 12 more examples completed by a consortium of several Czech manufacturers, led by Avia. SIPA, meanwhile, continued work on its prototype after the German retreat from France, with the first French-built Ar 396, redesignated SIPA S.10, flying on 29 December 1944.

Operational history
The Ar 96 was used for advanced, night and instrument-flying training.

During the Battle of Berlin, on the evening of 28 April 1945, test pilot Hanna Reitsch flew with then-Luftwaffe head Generalfeldmarschall Robert Ritter von Greim out from Berlin under Soviet fire in an Arado Ar 96 trainer, from an improvised airstrip in the Tiergarten.

Shadow production was undertaken by Letov and the Avia factory in occupied Czechoslovakia, where manufacturing continued for some years after the war, being designated the Avia C-2B.

A wooden version, known as the Ar 396, was built in France and was designated the SIPA S.10. Further developments were the SIPA S.11 (armed version), and the SIPA S.12, a metal version; 188 of all versions were produced until 1958. The S.11 was operated with some success in Algeria, carrying machine guns, rockets and light bombs.

Variants

Ar 96A
Two-seat advanced trainer aircraft. Initial production version.
Ar 96B
Improved version. Main production version.
Ar 96B-1
Unarmed pilot trainer version.
Ar 96B-2

Ar 96C

Ar 296
A proposed development of the Ar 96 with an Argus As 411 engine, abandoned in favour of the Ar 396, due to the use of non-strategic materials in the Ar 396 production.
Ar 396A-1
Single-seat gunnery trainer, powered by an Argus As 411 engine, built largely from wood.
Ar 396A-2
Unarmed instrument trainer version.
SIPA S.10
French production version of Ar 396, 28 produced.
SIPA S.11
Modified version of S.10, powered by Renault 12S (French built Argus As 411), 50 built for the French Air Force.
SIPA S.12
All-metal version of S.11, 52 built for the French Air Force.
SIPA S.121
Modified version of S.12, 58 built for the French Air Force.
Avia C.2B
Czechoslovak production version of the Ar 96B. Czechoslovak designation C.2B. 228 built by Avia and 182 by Letov between 1945 and 1950.

Production figures up to 1945

Operators

Bulgarian Air Force – Bulgaria received two Avia C.2s in 1948.

Czechoslovakian Air Force operated Avia C-2 variant postwar.
Czechoslovakian National Security Guard

French Air Force (Postwar)

Luftwaffe

Hungarian Air Force

Slovenské vzdušné zbrane

Surviving aircraft
 Arado Ar 96 B-1 – Deutsches Technikmuseum. Berlin, Germany.
 Arado Ar 96 B-1 – Flyhistorisk Museum. Sola, Norway.

Specifications (Arado Ar 96B-2)

See also

References

Notes

Bibliography

 Kranzhoff, Jörg Armin. Arado Ar 96 Varianten (Flugzeug Profile Nr. 43) (in German). Stengelheim, Germany: Unitec-Medienvertrieb, e.K., 2006. 
 Kudlicka, Bohumir. An Arado By Other Names: Czech Ar 96 and Ar 396 Production. Air Enthusiast 111, May/June 2004, pp. 45–49. 

 Mondey, David. The Concise Guide to Axis Aircraft of World War II. London: Chancellor, 1996.  .

 Smith J. R. and Kay, Anthony. German Aircraft of the Second World War. London: Putnam & Company, 1972. .

Ar 096
1930s German military trainer aircraft
Single-engined tractor aircraft
Low-wing aircraft
SIPA aircraft
Avia aircraft
Aircraft first flown in 1938